Kyogle bryophilus is a beetle in the Staphylinidae family, native to Tasmania.

It was first described by Arthur Mills Lea in 1911 as Euplectops bryophilus, from male and female specimens collected in Tasmania, from near Hobart and New Norfolk.

Description
Lea described Euplectops bryophilus as:

References

External links
Kyogle bryophilus images & occurrence data from GBIF

Kyogle bryophilus
Fauna of Tasmania
Taxa named by Arthur Mills Lea
Beetles described in 1911